Burke Landing is an unincorporated community located on the Mississippi River in Coahoma County, Mississippi, United States.

Burke Landing was formerly home to two churches, a grist mill, and sawmill.

The settlement appeared on a map from 1862.

In 2009, an EF2 tornado touched down in Burke Landing, causing some structural damage.

References

Unincorporated communities in Coahoma County, Mississippi
Unincorporated communities in Mississippi
Mississippi populated places on the Mississippi River